Murder in the First is a 1995 American legal drama film, directed by Marc Rocco, written by Dan Gordon, and starring Christian Slater, Kevin Bacon, Gary Oldman, Embeth Davidtz, Brad Dourif, William H. Macy, and R. Lee Ermey. It tells the alternate history of a petty criminal named Henri Young who is sent to Alcatraz Federal Penitentiary and later put on trial for murder in the first degree as the lawyer representing him recounts Henri's life and when he represented Henri. This film was described on the movie poster as "the case that took down Alcatraz".

The film was met with mixed reviews where there was some praise for Slater and Bacon's performances.

Plot
As a 17-year-old orphan, Henri Young went into a grocery story where he was denied work. This leads him to steal $5.00 from a grocery store to feed himself and his little sister Rosetta (Amanda Borden), both of whom are destitute. He is apprehended by the shopkeeper and arrested by the police while Rosetta is sent to an orphanage. Because that grocery store also housed a U.S. Post Office, his crime is upgraded to a federal offense. Young never sees Rosetta again and is sentenced to Leavenworth Penitentiary, Kansas.

Years later, Henri (Kevin Bacon) was transferred to Alcatraz. He gets oppressed by associate prison warden Milton Glenn. Henri participates in an escape attempt with two other prisoners Rufus McCain (David Michael Sterling) and Arthur Barker (Michael Melvin).

The escape plan fails due to the betrayal of McCain. Barker is killed by the guards and Glenn punishes Young by having him sent to "the hole", which is in Alcatraz's dungeons as he and Warden James Humson do a press conference proving that Alcatrax is inescapable. Glenn also had Henri tortured where he was struck in the back with a club, thrown down the stairs at one point, striking his face with a blackjack, and left naked in the hole at one point. Glenn even used a straight razor on his ankle to induce a hobble on Henri. Except for 30 minutes on Christmas Day in 1940, he is left in there for three years. The solitary confinement causes Young to lose his sanity.

On release back to the general population, he experiences a psychotic episode in the prison cafeteria and attacks McCain, stabbing him to death with a spoon in full view of the prison staff and the other convicts.

Young is put on trial in San Francisco for first degree murder in what district attorney William McNeil (William H. Macy) and the public-defender's office run by Mr. Henkin (Stephen Tobolowsky) believe is an open-and-shut case. Public defender James Stamphill (Christian Slater), a recent graduate of Harvard Law School, is given the case. After discovering the facts of Young's case, Stamphill attempts to put Alcatraz on trial by alleging that its harsh conditions drove him insane with his motives causing the dismay of Mr. Henkin, Stamphill's co-worker Mary McCasslin (Embeth Davidtz) and Stamphill's brother Byron (Brad Dourif). During one of his visits, Stamphill brought pleasure to Young by bringing in a prostitute named Blanche.

The trial overseen by Judge Clawson (R. Lee Ermey) becomes highly politicized and contentious. Glenn denied any mistreatment of Young claiming that he's not the villain here as Stamphill mentioned that anyone who went mad at Alcatraz was removed and never made it to the asylum. As Stamphill questioned ex-guard Derek Simpson (Charles Boswell) who admitted that Glenn had him partake in the torture, McNeil objected because Simspon was fired being because he was drunk. This caused Clawson to have the jury disregard Simpson's testimony as Stamphill later blamed Byron for that outcome. Stamphill also held Humson accountable for not being present during Glenn's actions towards Young and claiming that Humson never interacted with Young once as Humson claims that he runs two other prisons.

At one point in between the trial, Stamphill managed to track down Rosetta (Mia Kirshner) and brought her to visit Henri. He learns that Rosetta is doing alright and has named her baby after him.

Young tells Stamphill that he wants to change the plea to guilty as he would rather be dead than be sent back to Alcatraz. Young is convicted of involuntary manslaughter and not first-degree murder as the jury recommends that Alcatraz should undergo a federal investigation as they also find Alcatraz, Humson, and Glenn guilty of crimes against humanity. Stamphill tells Young that he will appeal to have him sent to another prison and see if he can reopen Young's original case. Stamphill's narration states that this would be the last time he saw Young alive as he would later be found dead in his cell where he had "victory" written back on the walls where he did not die in vain. Young is returned to Alcatraz and put in "the hole" on Glenn's orders with Young claiming that he still won either way as the inmates bang on the cells.

As Young is taken to "the hole", Stamphill's narration states that the Supreme Court agreed with the facts of the trial which led to the dungeons of Alcatrax being closed forever. Glenn was charged for mistreatment. He was found guilt and will never work in the US penal system again. While noting that he still remained in the private practice, Stamphill in his narration thanked Young for making him a baseball fan and concludes his narration by stating "You did it, Henri"!

A postscript states that Alcatraz as a prison was closed down forever in 1963. It remains a tourist attraction that has been visited by a million tourists.

Cast

 Christian Slater as James Stamphill, a defense attorney who represents Henri Young and is also the narrator of the film.
 Kevin Bacon as Henri Young, a young man sent to Alcatraz for petty theft.
 Gary Oldman as Milton Glenn, the associate prison warden of Alcatraz.
 Embeth Davidtz as Mary McCasslin
 William H. Macy as D.A. William McNeil, the district attorney who prosecutes Young.
 Brad Dourif as Byron Stamphill, the brother of James who is also a lawyer.
 R. Lee Ermey as Judge Clawson, a judge who oversees the trial of Henri Young.
 Stephen Tobolowsky as Mr. Henkin, Stamphill's boss.
 Mia Kirshner as Rosetta Young, the fictional sister of Henri Young who would later get engaged to a man named Mr. Dial.
 Amanda Borden as young Rosetta Young
 Ben Slack as Jerry Hoolihan
 Stefan Gierasch as James Humson, the prison warden of Alcatraz and Glenn's boss who is also the warden of San Quentin State Prison and Folsom State Prison.
 Kyra Sedgwick as Blanche, a prostitute that James brings to visit Henri.
 Charles Boswell as Derek Simpson, a guard at Alcatraz who assisted Glenn in torturing Henri before he was later fired.
 David Michael Sterling as Rufus McCain, an inmate who takes part in Young's early escape attempt and betrays him to Glenn which led to McCain's death.
 Michael Melvin as Arthur "Doc" Barker, an inmate who takes part in Young's early escape attempt and is killed by the guards.
 Tony Barr as Winthrop
 Stuart Nisbet as Harv
 Gary Ballard as Terrence Swenson, an Alcatraz guard.
 Randy Pelish as Wimer, an Alcatraz guard.
 Neil Summers as Whitney, an Alcatraz guard.
 Sonny King as Wimer, an Alcatraz guard.
 Theo Mayes as a prison barber
 Wally Rose as the shopkeeper of a grocery store that Henri tries to rob.
 Eve Brenner as Winthrop's secretary

Men on the Street portrayed by Bill Barretta, Randy Dudly, William Hall, Sheldon Feldner, Fred Franklin, Joseph Lucas

Production

Filming 
To prepare for his role as Henri Young, Kevin Bacon spent a night in a solitary cell and lost twenty pounds.

Principal photography began on December 13, 1993 in Los Angeles, California, with the courtroom sequences being filmed first. On January 17, 1994, filming at Triscenic Production Services Inc. in Sylmar was interrupted by the 1994 Northridge earthquake. Filming resumed two weeks after the quake, and in February, the production moved to Alcatraz Island in the San Francisco Bay. Filming there had to be done at night, because the National Park Service did not want to disrupt daily tourism in the daytime. More than 300 crew members had to be crammed in the prison cells. Production wrapped on March 12, 1994.

Historical accuracy
The film makes numerous changes to historical events. The real Henri Young was not convicted of stealing $5 to save his sister from destitution. He had been a hardened bank robber who had taken a hostage on at least one occasion and had committed a murder in 1933. Young was also no stranger to the penal system. Before being incarcerated at Alcatraz in 1936, he had already served time in two state prisons in Montana and Washington. In 1935 he spent his first year in federal correctional facilities at McNeil Island, Washington before being transferred to Alcatraz.

The film ends with the fictional Henri Young being returned to the dungeons of Alcatraz in the early 1940s where he supposedly dies. In reality the real Young remained on Alcatraz until 1948 before he was moved to the United States Medical Center for Federal Prisoners at Springfield, Missouri where he stayed until 1954. While on Alcatraz he remained in the main cell block. Young was not kept in any dungeon as they had been closed almost a decade earlier. In 1954, Young was transferred to the Washington State Penitentiary at Walla Walla to begin a life sentence for the murder conviction in 1933.

In 1972, after Young was released from Washington State Penitentiary at age 61, he jumped parole. According to Washington State authorities his whereabouts remain unknown.

According to the San Francisco Examiner, April 16, 1941, the Defense stated in court that Henri Young was locked up in solitary confinement for over three years. This is taken directly from the paper, "Emphasis which they repeatedly laid on the fact that Young was in isolation or solitary confinement for more than three years—and that he drove his knife into McCain’s abdomen just eleven days after release from such confinement, made it clear that the defense hopes to show not only that Young was “punch-drunk” but that the punches were administered by the Alcatraz "system".

Four other prisoners attempted to escape Alcatraz with Young, not just two. One of the men omitted from the film (Dale Stamphill) has the same last name as Young's lawyer.

Many of the ideas in the movie were taken directly from newspaper articles of the trials, including the ending scene where the jury only convicts Young of manslaughter, and requests that Alcatraz be investigated.

Release
The film was released on January 20, 1995 in 1,237 theaters in the U.S. and Canada and grossed $4,719,188 in its opening weekend. The film went on to gross $17,381,942 in the U.S. and Canada and $29.5 million worldwide against a $20 million budget.

Reception
On review aggregate website Rotten Tomatoes, Murder in the First has a score of 54% based on reviews from 39 critics. The site's consensus states: "Despite a strong cast and story inspired by incredible real-life events, Murder in the First is strictly second rate."

Though Bacon received a positive notices for his performance, critics negatively cited the film's handheld camera shots, scenes of brutality, and underdeveloped characters. Mick LaSalle of the San Francisco Chronicle wrote, "'Murder in the First' lacks an all-important core of emotion. It tries to find it in the growing friendship between the lawyer and the client on trial for murder, with scenes of the lawyer trying to draw the convict out — and of the two men talking freely. But the friendship never seems more than a device."

Roger Ebert gave the film 2 out of 4 stars, and said Slater "is an actor with talent, but he is too young for this role, and not confident enough to dial [his performance] down a little."

Screenwriter Dan Gordon, who was unhappy with the film version of his script, wrote a novelization of his screenplay and later adapted it into a stage play.

Awards and nominations 
Kevin Bacon won the Critics' Choice Award for Best Actor and was nominated for a Screen Actors Guild Award for Outstanding Performance by a Male Actor in a Supporting Role.

References

External links

 
 
 
 
 Henri Young—Alcatraz Killing

1995 films
1990s crime drama films
1995 drama films
1990s legal films
1990s prison films
American courtroom films
American legal drama films
American prison drama films
Films about miscarriage of justice
Films directed by Marc Rocco
Films scored by Christopher Young
Films set in the 1940s
Films set in the San Francisco Bay Area
Films set on islands
Drama films based on actual events
Alcatraz Island in fiction
StudioCanal films
The Wolper Organization films
Torture in films
1990s English-language films
1990s American films